The 2003 Petit Le Mans was the ninth and final race in the 2003 American Le Mans Series season and was held at Road Atlanta.  It took place on October 18, 2003.

Official results

Class winners in bold.  Cars failing to complete 70% of winner's distance marked as Not Classified (NC).

Statistics
 Pole Position - #1 Infineon Team Joest - 1:11.738
 Fastest Lap - #38 Champion Racing - 1:12.624
 Distance - 
 Average Speed -

External links
 

P
Petit Le Mans